Luzula hawaiiensis, commonly known as Hawai'i wood-rush, is a species of perennial plant in Juncaceae family that is endemic to Hawaii.

References

Endemic flora of Hawaii
hawaiiensis
Flora without expected TNC conservation status